The Quartermain Mountains are a group of exposed mountains in Antarctica, about  long, typical of ice-free features of the McMurdo Dry Valleys, Victoria Land, located south of Taylor Glacier and bounded by Finger Mountain, Mount Handsley, Mount Feather and Tabular Mountain; also including Knobhead, Terra Cotta Mountain, New Mountain, Beacon Heights, Pyramid Mountain, Arena Valley, Kennar Valley, Turnabout Valley and the several valleys and ridges within Beacon Valley.

Exploration 
The mountains were visited by British expeditions led by Robert Falcon Scott (1901–04 and 1910–13) and Ernest Shackleton (1907–09), who applied several names. Names were added in the years subsequent to the International Geophysical Year, 1957–58, concurrent with research carried out by New Zealand Antarctic Research Programme and United States Antarctic Research Program field parties, and to fulfill the requirement for maps compiled from United States Navy aerial photographs, 1947–83. In 1977, the New Zealand Antarctic Place-Names Committee named the mountains after New Zealand Antarctic historian Lester Bowden Quartermain (1895–1973).

List of mountains

Mount Benninghoff 
Mount Benninghoff is a mainly ice-free mountain (1,965 m) standing 1.5 nautical miles (2.8 km) southeast of Terra Cotta Mountain. Named by Advisory Committee on Antarctic Names in 1993 after William S. Benninghoff (1918–93), Professor of Botany, University of Michigan, 1957–88, retiring as Professor Emeritus of Botany; seasonal visits to Antarctica in 1968, 1976, 1977 and 1989; member, Scientific Committee on Antarctic Research (SCAR) Working Group on Biology, 1968–87; member, Polar Research Board of the National Academy of Sciences, 1966–86.

Mount Feather 
Mount Feather is a massive mountain, with a broad flattish summit, standing at the southern extremity of the Quartermain Mountains. Named after Thomas A. Feather, Royal Navy, Boatswain on the Discovery during the British National Antarctic Expedition (1901–04), who accompanied Scott in his Western Journey to this area in 1903.

Finger Mountain 
So named by the British National Antarctic Expedition (1901–04) because a long tongue of dolerite between the sandstone strata has the appearance of a finger.

Pyramid Mountain 
The name seems first to appear on maps of the British Antarctic Expedition (R.F. Scott), 1910–13, but the mountain was almost certainly seen for the first time during Scott's first expedition, 1901–04.

Tabular Mountain 
Descriptively named by the British National Antarctic Expedition, 1901–04.

Terra Cotta Mountain 
Terra Cotta Mountain is a mountain between Windy Gully and Knobhead, on the southern side of Taylor Glacier. The descriptive name was applied by the British National Antarctic Expedition, 1901–04.

Other features
Nadir Bluff
Plumb Bob Point
Subtense Valley

References

Mountain ranges of Victoria Land
McMurdo Dry Valleys